Three Elements is a March 1925 abstract painting by the Russian artist Wassily Kandinsky.

History
Kandinsky presented it to his nephew Alexandre Kojève, in whose family it remained after Kojève's death in 1968. The painting was bought in 2002 from Kojève's widow, Nina Ivanoff (also spelled Ivanov) and is now in the Musée d'Art moderne et contemporain of Strasbourg, France. Its inventory number is 55.002.3.1.

See also
List of paintings by Wassily Kandinsky

References

External links 
Drei Elemente on the museum's website

Paintings in the collection of the Strasbourg Museum of Modern and Contemporary Art
Paintings by Wassily Kandinsky
1925 paintings
Oil paintings
Modern paintings